Numurkah Solar Farm is a solar photovoltaic power station owned by Neoen near the town of Numurkah in the Australian state of Victoria.

At its commissioning in 2019, Numurkah was the largest solar farm in Victoria. It cost  and generates up to 112MW of AC electricity (installed 128MWp DC). It retains the use of farmland for sheep agistment (Agri-Solar). Its primary customers are the Melbourne tram network and Laverton steel works under power purchase agreements. The Laverton steel works is a scrap iron recycler owned by the GFG Alliance.

References

Solar power stations in Victoria (Australia)